Albert Coates may refer to:

Albert Coates (musician) (1882–1953), Anglo-Russian conductor and composer
Albert Coates (surgeon) (1895–1977), Australian surgeon and soldier
Albert Coates (professor) (1896–1989), founder and long-time director of the Institute of Government at the University of North Carolina

See also
Al Coates (disambiguation)